Sardab (also Romanized as Sardāb) is a village in Pain Velayat Rural District, in the Central District of Taybad County, Razavi Khorasan Province, Iran. At the 2006 census, its population was 296, in 59 families.

References 

Populated places in Taybad County